Jan Sadharan Express trains are series of passenger services operated by Indian Railways in different routes. These trains are the first generation of fully unreserved express train sets. The second generation is the Antyodya Express

About 
Jan Sadharan Express trains are a series of passenger services operated by Indian Railways on the lines of Rajdhani Express, Jan Shatabdi Express, etc. Jan Sadharan Express trains are fully unreserved trains thereby providing cheaper transport aimed at common people. The services were first announced during the Interim Rail budget on 30 January 2004. Muzaffarpur–Ahmedabad Jansadharan Express and Muzaffarpur–Lokmanya Tilak Terminus Jansadharan Express, were announced as weekly service during the full rail budget on 6 July 2004, of which the latter was introduced on 2 October 2004 along with new service of Hajipur–Ahmedabad Jansadharan Express. During 2007–2008 Railway Budget, a new route of Chhapra–Chhatrapati Shivaji Terminus Jansadharan Express was added to the list. During 2008–2009 Railway Budget, Amritsar–Saharsa Jan Sadharan Express was introduced. During 2009–2010 Interim Railway Budget, Barauni–Delhi Jan Sadharan Express was introduced. During 2014–2015 Railway Budget, 5 more Jan Sadharan Express trains were introduced, which were Ahmedabad – Darbhanga Jan Sadharan Express, Jaynagar – Mumbai Jan Sadharan Express, Mumbai – Gorakhpur Jan Sadharan Express, Gorakhpur - Amritsar Jan Sadharan Express, Saharsa – Anand Vihar Jan Sadharan Express and Saharsa - Amritsar Jan Sadharan Express.

Active Services

Defunct Fleets

The above trains are converted into antyodya express trains.

References

External links 

2004 establishments in India